V376 Carinae is a binary star system in the southern constellation of Carina. It has the Bayer designation b1 Carinae; V376 Carinae is the variable star designation. The system is visible to the naked eye as a faint point of light with a combined apparent magnitude of +4.69. The distance to this system from the Sun is approximately 650 light years based on parallax. It is drifting further away with a radial velocity of +27 km/s.

The magnitude 4.87 primary, designated component A, is a B-type main-sequence star with a stellar classification of B2V. During a search for Beta Cephei variables in the southern sky, it was initially classed as a very short period variable. However, this variability was not confirmed by subsequent observations. Samus et al. (2017) now suspect it is a constant star that was assigned a variable designation in haste. It has an estimated age of 12.5 million years with 7.8 times the mass of the Sun. The star is radiating nearly three thousand times the Sun's luminosity from its photosphere at an effective temperature of 21,150 K.

The companion star, component B,  was discovered by Scottish astronomer James Dunlop in 1836. It has a class of B9.5V with an apparent magnitude of +6.58.

References

B-type main-sequence stars
Binary stars
Carina (constellation)
Carinae, b1
Durchmusterung objects
077002
043937
3582
Carinae, V376